Sarov is a town in Nizhny Novgorod Oblast, Russia. It may also refer to
Places
Sarov Monastery in Sarov, Russia
Sarov, Goranboy, a village and municipality in the Goranboy Rayon of Azerbaijan
Sarov, Tartar, a village and municipality in the Tartar Rayon of Azerbaijan
Sarovlu, a village in the Goranboy Rayon of Azerbaijan

Other
HC Sarov, an ice hockey team in Sarov, Russia
Sarov-class submarine
Seraphim of Sarov (1754–1833), Russian monk